Satyaki Banerjee is an Indian Bengali composer. He is a part of an Anglo-Bengali band with members in Kolkata and London. He plays instruments like the dotara and the sarod, and his performances incorporate both the classical and the folk idioms. He studied the sarod with the late Pandit Dipak Chowdhury and now trains under Pandit Tejendra Narayan Majumdar. He picked up the dotara in the company of practising folk musicians, in akhras and melas and in him the classical and folk meld to evolve into a unique style of playing. He is also a self-taught oud and rebab player, besides being a magnificent singer of mostly Bengali mystical poetry, in the baul and kirtan traditions.

Personal life
Satyaki is a historian by training and takes serious academic interest in the music he practices. He studied from Julien Day School, Kolkata, Elgin Road branch.

Music life
Satyaki has been part of Parapar since 2005, but he has also performed independently with Mousumi Bhowmik in concerts at home and abroad, including in New York, London, Leeds, Dhaka and Chittagong. Banerjee is the music director of 2021 Bengali web series Birohi. He is also a member of the experimental band Borno Anonyo.

References

Year of birth missing (living people)
Living people
Indian male composers
Hindustani instrumentalists
Sarod players
Musicians from Kolkata